Bad magic or evil magic may refer to:

Common meanings
 Black magic, the use of supernatural powers or magic for evil and selfish purposes
 Maleficium (sorcery), malevolent, dangerous, or harmful magic

Music
 Bad Magic Records, an imprint of the Wall of Sound record label
 Bad Magic, a 2015 album by English rock band Motörhead
 "Bad Magick", a song by American rock band Godsmack
 "Bad Magick", a song by American country singer-songwriter Shooter Jennings from his 2006 album Electric Rodeo
 Bad Magick: The Best of Shooter Jennings and the .357's, a 2009 compilation album by Shooter Jennings

Other uses
 Bad Magic (Pseudonymous Bosch), a 2014 book by Pseudonymous Bosch